Wales and Fiji have played each other at rugby union since 1985, when Wales won the inaugural game 40-3. Since then they have played each other on eleven other occasions, including four times at the Rugby World Cup – in 2007, 2011, 2015 and 2019; they are also scheduled to meet in the 2023 Rugby World Cup. Wales have won 10 out of the 12 matches played, with Fiji winning one of the remaining two, and one draw. Fiji's win saw them qualify for the quarter-finals of the 2007 World Cup ahead of Wales, the last time Wales failed to qualify for the knockout stage of the competition.

Summary
Note: Summary below reflects test results by both teams.

Overall

Records
Note: Date shown in brackets indicates when the record was or last set.

Results

XV Results
Below are a list of matches that Fiji has awarded matches test match status by virtue of awarding caps, but Wales did not award caps.

Wales
Fiji